Yorkana is a borough in York County, Pennsylvania, United States. The population was 236 at the 2020 census. It is a linear town, spread along Mt. Pisgah Road which is called Main Street in town. The borough includes several dozen houses, two churches, and a few businesses.

Geography

Demographics

As of the census of 2000, there were 239 people, 95 households, and 66 families residing in the borough. The population density was 1,306.9 people per square mile (512.7/km2). There were 100 housing units at an average density of 546.8 per square mile (214.5/km2). The racial makeup of the borough was 100.00% White. Hispanic or Latino of any race were 1.26% of the population.

There were 95 households, out of which 33.7% had children under the age of 18 living with them, 63.2% were married couples living together, 5.3% had a female householder with no husband present, and 29.5% were non-families. 27.4% of all households were made up of individuals, and 10.5% had someone living alone who was 65 years of age or older. The average household size was 2.52 and the average family size was 3.01.

In the borough, the population was spread out, with 25.5% under the age of 18, 7.9% from 18 to 24, 30.5% from 25 to 44, 25.5% from 45 to 64, and 10.5% who were 65 years of age or older. The median age was 37 years. For every 100 females, there were 100.8 males. For every 100 females age 18 and over, there were 95.6 males.

The median income for a household in the borough was $45,278, and the median income for a family was $43,125. Males had a median income of $38,333 versus $19,688 for females. The per capita income for the borough was $16,599. About 2.9% of families and 2.1% of the population were below the poverty line, including none of those under the age of eighteen or sixty five or over.

Education
Yorkana is served by the Eastern York School District.

References

Populated places established in 1800
Boroughs in York County, Pennsylvania
1913 establishments in Pennsylvania